Kieran Chan (born December 29, 1984) is a Papua New Guinean former swimmer, who specialized in breaststroke events. Chan competed for Papua New Guinea in the men's 100 m breaststroke at the 2000 Summer Olympics in Sydney. He received a Universality place from FINA, in an entry time of 1:14.40. He participated in heat one against two other swimmers Antonio Leon of Paraguay and Joe Atuhaire of Uganda. Diving in with a 0.95-second deficit, Chan enjoyed the race of his life to take only a second seed in a lifetime best of 1:13.34. Chan failed to advance into the semifinals, as he placed sixty-third overall on the first day of prelims.

References

External links

1984 births
Living people
Papua New Guinean male swimmers
Olympic swimmers of Papua New Guinea
Swimmers at the 2000 Summer Olympics
Male breaststroke swimmers
People from the National Capital District (Papua New Guinea)